
Gmina Debrzno is an urban-rural gmina (administrative district) in Człuchów County, Pomeranian Voivodeship, in northern Poland.

Villages
Apart from the town of Debrzno, Gmina Debrzno contains the villages and settlements of Boboszewo, Bolesławowo, Buchowo, Buka, Buszkowo, Cierznie, Drozdowo, Główna, Gniewno, Grzymisław, Kamień, Kostrzyca, Miłachowo, Myśligoszcz, Nierybie, Nowe Gronowo, Ostrza, Pędziszewo, Pokrzywy, Poręba, Prusinowo, Przypólsko, Rozdoły, Rozwory, Skowarnki, Słupia, Służewo, Smug, Stanisławka, Stare Gronowo, Strzeczona, Strzeczonka, Strzeszyn, Uniechów and Uniechówek.

Neighbouring gminas
Gmina Debrzno is bordered by the gminas of Czarne, Człuchów, Kamień Krajeński, Lipka, Okonek and Sępólno Krajeńskie.

References
Polish official population figures 2006

Debrzno
Człuchów County